This is a worldwide list of World Athletics Label Road Races marathon runs.

Legend

Race list

Platinum

Gold

Gold/Elite/Label

See also

World Athletics Label Road Races
World Marathon Majors

References

External links
List of marathons in the United States and Canada 
List of Fastest Marathons - U.S. & Canada 
List of marathons 1940–present (Association of Road Racing Statisticians)
List of marathons from Association of International Marathons and Road Races

Marathon races